This is a list of lighthouses in Somaliland.

Lighthouses

See also
 List of lighthouses in Somalia
 Lists of lighthouses and lightvessels

References

External links

Somaliland
Lighthouses